Movement assessment is the practice of analysing movement performance during functional tasks to determine the kinematics of individual joints and their effect on the kinetic chain. Three-dimensional or two-dimensional analysis of the biomechanics involved in sporting tasks can assist in prevention of injury and enhancing athletic performance. Identification of abnormal movement mechanics provides physical therapists and Athletic trainers the ability to prescribe more accurate corrective exercise programs to prevent injury and improve exercise rehabilitation and progression following injury and assist in determining readiness to return to sport.

Landing Error Scoring System (LESS)
The LESS is a valid and reliable tool for the biomechanical assessment of the jump landing technique. The LESS involves the scoring of 22 biomechanical criteria of the lower extremity and trunk, with the outcomes being associated with the risk of anterior cruciate ligament (ACL) and patellofemoral injury. LESS scoring is split into the following categories: excellent (0-3); good (4-5); moderate (6-7); and poor (>7). Identification of biomechanical abnormalities in landing technique, the effect of fatigue  and differences between gender  allow for more precise clinical exercise intervention to reduce the risk of injury.

Unsupported single leg squat
The single leg squat is an exercise that was developed into a functional test by Liebenson  to examine the biomechanics of the lower extremity, assess hip muscle dysfunction  and provide an indication of mechanics during daily functional tasks. The test requires the person to stand on the limb being tested, with the non-weight bearing limb in about 45° of hip flexion and about 90° of knee flexion. The person's arms should be in 90° of shoulder flexion and full elbow extension. The athlete is required to squat down to at least 60° of knee flexion and return to the start position within 6 seconds.

Single Leg Hop for Distance
Single leg hop tests are commonly used to assess functional knee performance by assessing limb symmetry after an anterior cruciate ligament injury  or following anterior cruciate ligament reconstruction. The hop tests mainly used are: the single leg hop for distance; crossover hop test; triple hop test; 6m timed hop test; square hop test and side-to-side hop test. The limb symmetry is assessed by means of the limb symmetry index (LSI). Normal values for return to play criteria following ACL reconstruction indicate that the injured limb should be greater than or equal to 90% of the uninjured limb.

References

Biomechanics
Physical exercise
Sports science